was the lead ship in the  of armored cruisers in the Imperial Japanese Navy. Ibuki was named after Mount Ibuki, located between Gifu and Shiga prefectures in Honshū. On 28 August 1912, the Ibukis were re-classified as battlecruisers.

Design and construction
Problems with her turbine engines delayed the construction of Ibuki, and construction began almost two years later than her sister ship, Kurama, which used standard reciprocating engines. Ibuki was built at Kure Naval Arsenal and was laid down on 22 May 1907, launched on 21 October 1907, and commissioned on 11 November 1907.

Operational history
Shortly after she was commissioned, Ibuki was sent on a voyage to Thailand to attend the coronation ceremony of the Thai king Rama VI Vajiravudh. Ibuki served in World War I, participating in the hunt for the German light cruiser  in 1914. She escorted a convoy of 10 troop transports carrying the main body of the New Zealand Expeditionary Force, crossing the Tasman Sea with the British protected cruiser  and armoured cruiser  to Albany, Western Australia in November 1914. Together with the Australian light cruiser , Ibuki escorted the ANZACs, consisting of 20,000 men and 7,500 horses, across the Indian Ocean.

Ibuki was the only protection for the ANZACs when Sydney participated in the Battle of Cocos. The commander of Ibuki, Captain Kanji Katō had wanted the honor of engaging Emden, but despite being a superior ship to Sydney was ordered to stand down and stay with the convoy. This was later celebrated by the Royal Australian Navy as the "samurai spirit of the Ibuki" whenever Imperial Japanese ships visited Australia in subsequent years.

Fate
After the war, Ibuki fell victim to the Washington Naval Treaty and was sold for scrap on 20 September 1923. Her guns were salvaged and used in shore batteries at Hakodate in Hokkaidō and along the Tsugaru Strait separating Honshū and Hokkaidō.

Notes

References

Ibuki-class battlecruisers
Ships built by Kure Naval Arsenal
1907 ships
World War I battlecruisers of Japan